Salicifolia, a Latin word meaning willow-leaved, may refer to:

 O. salicifolia
 Olea salicifolia, a plant species in the genus Olea
 Q. salicifolia
 Quercus salicifolia, a tree species in the genus Quercus found in Mexico
 U. salicifolia
 Utleria salicifolia, a tree species in the genus Utleria found near the Pambar River in India

Subspecies / varieties
 Amsonia tabernaemontana var. salicifolia (N), a variety of Amsonia tabernaemontana, the Eastern bluestar, a species in the genus Amsonia
 Faramea multiflora var. salicifolia (C. Presl.) Steyerm., a plant subspecies in the species Faramea multiflora and the genus Faramea
 Ficus cordata ssp. salicifolia (Vahl) Berg
 Lonicera × salicifolia (I), a variety in the genus Lonicera
 Olearia phlogopappa var. salicifolia (Hook.f.) W.M.Curtis, a cultivar in the species O. phlogopappa

See also
 Salicifolium
 Salicifolius